Mykola Mykolayovych Mykhaylenko (born 22 May 2001) is a Ukrainian professional footballer who plays as a midfielder for Dynamo Kyiv.

Club career

Early years
Started his career at DYuFSh Yevropa Pryluky. Then he moved to Kyiv, where he played for Peremozhets.

Dynamo Kyiv
At the age of 13, he moved to the youth ranks of Dynamo Kyiv.

Loan to Chornomorets Odesa
In July 2021, he moved on loan to Chornomorets Odesa.
On 25 July 2021, he made his league debut in the losing away match against Desna Chernihiv at the Chernihiv Stadium.

Loan to Oleksandriya
In January 2023, he moved on loan to Oleksandriya.

References

External links
 
 

2001 births
Living people
People from Varva, Chernihiv Oblast
Ukrainian Premier League players
FC Dynamo Kyiv players
FC Chornomorets Odesa players
FC Zorya Luhansk players
Association football midfielders
Ukraine youth international footballers
Ukraine under-21 international footballers
Ukrainian footballers
Sportspeople from Chernihiv Oblast
21st-century Ukrainian people